Al Hilal a is multipurpose district in central Doha. It is home to the Doha Mall, the city's first shopping centre. Prior to the 2010 census, Zone 41 comprised Al Hilal West, but the zone was later transferred to Nuaija. Many sizable residences are situated here, and the Embassy of India, Doha formerly had its headquarters here.

Geography
Al Hilal borders the following districts:
Old Airport to the south, separated by D Ring Road.
Doha International Airport to the east, separated by Airport Street.
Najma to the north, separated by C Ring Road.
Nuaija to the west, separated by Najma Street.

Landmarks
Al Hilal Park on Wadi Al Neel Street.
Focus Medical Centre on Najma Street.
Plastic Surgicentre on Najma Street.
Medcare Clinic on Al Salam Street.
Al Shefa Polyclinic on D Ring Road.
Spark Languages Centre on Najma Street.
Education Institute - Supreme Education Council on C Ring Road.
United Parcel Service (UPS) Cargo on D Ring Road.
Alijara Holding on D Ring Road.
Al Khansa Library for Women on D Ring Road.
Al Manaa Tower on Al Matar Street.

Transport
Major roads that run through the district are C Ring Road, D Ring Road, and Airport Street.

Currently, the underground Al Hilal Metro Station is under construction, having been launched during Phase 1A. Once completed, it will serve Doha Metro's Green Line and Blue Line.

Demographics

Religion

Mosques
Seven public mosques are found in the district. They are:

Education
One of Qatar's largest public libraries is located in Al Hilal under the name Al Khansa Library for Women. Established in 1981, its collection consists of 60,000 Arabic-language books and 5,000 English-language books.

The following schools are located in Al Hilal:

References

Doha
Communities in Doha